Count Otto Heinrich Igelström (Iosif Andreyevich Igelström; 7 May 1737 - 1823) was a Russian general from the noble Swedish family of Igelström.

Otto Heinrich Igelström, son of Landmarschall (Country Marshal) in the Governorate of Livonia Freiherr Gustaf Henrik Igelström and Margarethe Elisabeth von Albedyll, was born on 7 May 1737 in Gargždai (now Lithuania). He was educated in Riga and Germany.

In 1753, Otto entered military service in Russia, participated in the Russo-Turkish War of 1768–1774. In 1777, he became lord of Unipiha manor and in 1781, lord of Meeri manor in Livonia (now in Nõo Parish, Estonia). In 1784, he commanded Russian troops in Crimea and took the last Crimean khan Şahin Giray prisoner. He participated in Russo-Swedish War of 1788–90 and was empowered to sign the Treaty of Värälä on behalf of Russian Empire in 1790. After that, he was the general en chef and commander of the Finland Corps. In 1784 to 1792, Otto was the governor-general of Siberia and Ufa governorates. In 1792, he was granted Russian nobility title and was made the governor-general of Pskov Governorate. In 1793, he took the same position of the Kiev and Chernigov governorates.

In 1794, Otto was appointed ambassador to Warsaw and the commander of Russian troops in Poland. For his failure in suppressing the Warsaw Uprising of 1794 he was demoted. He was infantry general since 1796. Paul I of Russia took him into service in the rank of infantry general and appointed the governor-general to Orenburg Governorate in 1797.

See also
 Młodziejowski Palace in Warsaw
 Ambassadors and envoys from Russia to Poland (1763–1794)

References

External links
 Genealogisches Handbuch der baltischen Ritterschaften Estland - Genealogy Handbook of Baltic nobility
 Manors in Nõo parish, Estonia

1737 births
1823 deaths
Baltic-German people
Baltic nobility
Imperial Russian Army generals
Russian people of the Kościuszko Uprising
People from the Russian Empire of Swedish descent
Russian nobility
Swedish nobility
Recipients of the Order of St. George of the Third Degree
People from Gargždai
Russian military personnel of the Russo-Swedish War (1788–1790)
People from the Governorate of Livonia
18th-century diplomats
People of the Russo-Turkish War (1768–1774)
Ambassadors of the Russian Empire to Poland